Sloten is a village in the Dutch province of North Holland. It is a part of the municipality of Amsterdam, and lies about 6 km west of the city centre.

Sloten became a separate municipality in 1816. Absorbed into Amsterdam in January 1921, Sloten (founded in the year 990) became the oldest part of Amsterdam (itself founded in 1254). Sloten is one of the few remnants of various places that have marks of Osdorp before the 1950s and Sloterdijk as well, Sloten was threatened by urbanisation on many occasions between the 1950s and the 1970s, as thousands of houses rose between the wide polderland of the Osdorp region. Sloten remained untouched by suburban growth until in the 1980s, when the Netherlands campaigned to host the 1992 Summer Olympics. Officials proposed that the area around Sloten will become an Olympic Village. When Barcelona was chosen to be the host, they changed plans and built to create Nieuw Sloten, which rose in the 1990s.

During the 1928 Summer Olympics, Sloten hosted the rowing events. Now it is best known for the working windmill, transformed into the Rembrandt Sloten Windmill/Coopery Museum.

Notable people
Andreas Peter Cornelius Sol

Gallery

References

External links

Amsterdam Nieuw-West
Venues of the 1928 Summer Olympics
Olympic rowing venues
Populated places in North Holland
Former municipalities of North Holland
Geography of Amsterdam